Hummel is an unincorporated community in Rockcastle County, Kentucky, United States. The community is accessed from Kentucky Route 1786 (Wildie Road) or U.S. Route 25 via Hummel Road.

Geography
Roundstone Creek passes through the community.

References

Unincorporated communities in Kentucky
Unincorporated communities in Rockcastle County, Kentucky